Donald Alexander may refer to:

 Donald Alexander (filmmaker) (1913–1993), British documentary film-maker
 Donald Alexander (lawyer) (1921–2009), tax lawyer and Nixon administration official
 Donald Alexander (researcher) (1928–2007), Scottish physician and researcher
 Donald G. Alexander (born 1942), American lawyer and justice on the Maine Supreme Judicial Court